Lester Ders (born 7 May 1989) is a Cuban modern pentathlete.

Ders represented Cuba at the 2020 Tokyo Summer Olympics, competing in the men's modern pentathlon.

References 

1989 births
Living people
Cuban male modern pentathletes
Olympic modern pentathletes of Cuba
Modern pentathletes at the 2020 Summer Olympics
Pan American Games competitors for Cuba
Modern pentathletes at the 2019 Pan American Games